William Steere may refer to:

 William C. Steere Jr. (born 1936), chief executive officer of Pfizer
 William C. Steere (1907–1989), American botanist
 William Steere (priest) (died 1638), Irish Anglican priest

See also
William Steer (1888–1969), English amateur footballer
William Bridgland Steer (1867–1939), British trade unionist and politician